Pittsburg Center station is a Bay Area Rapid Transit station on the . There is no reserved parking available at this station.

History 

Construction of the station was uncertain at the time of eBART's approval due to lack of available funds. The station was originally known as Railroad Avenue during planning. The city later chose Pittsburg Civic Center, which BART rejected because of its similarity to Civic Center/UN Plaza station. In January 2015, the city accepted BART's proposal of Pittsburg Center.

Funding for the station was secured in early 2015 and was estimated at $11.9 million (equivalent to $ million in ). Construction commenced on July 27, 2015, and was opened with the rest of the line on May 26, 2018.

, Pittsburg Center was the least-used station on the BART system, with 1,464 daily boardings.

References

External links 
BART – Pittsburg Center
Pittsburg Center Station Walkthrough Animation (YouTube)

Pittsburg, California
Stations on the Yellow Line (BART)
Bay Area Rapid Transit stations in Contra Costa County, California
Railway stations in the United States opened in 2018
2018 establishments in California
Bus stations in Contra Costa County, California